Marko Sentić (born 19 April 1976) is a Croatian judoka.

Achievements

See also
List of judoka
List of world champions in judo
Judo in Croatia

References

External links
http://www.judoinside.com/judoka/7530

Croatian male judoka
1976 births
Living people
Place of birth missing (living people)